In Greek mythology, Parthaon (Ancient Greek: Παρθάονος) may refer to two different characters:

 Parthaon, more commonly known as Porthaon, king of Calydon and father of Oeneus, the grandfather of Diomedes.
 Parthaon, an Arcadian king as the son of Periphetes, descendant of King Lycaon. He begat Aristus who became the ancestor of Psophis, one of the possible eponyms for the city of Psophis. In some accounts, Parthaon was instead the son of Dorieus, son of Eikadios and Coroneia. He was the father of Paros and Ceteus who had a daughter Callisto by Stilbe.

Notes

References 

 Apollodorus, The Library with an English Translation by Sir James George Frazer, F.B.A., F.R.S. in 2 Volumes, Cambridge, MA, Harvard University Press; London, William Heinemann Ltd. 1921. ISBN 0-674-99135-4. Online version at the Perseus Digital Library. Greek text available from the same website.
 Fowler, Robert L., Early Greek Mythography. Volume 2: Commentary. Oxford University Press. Great Clarendon Street, Oxford, OX2 6DP, United Kingdom. 2013. 
Pausanias, Description of Greece with an English Translation by W.H.S. Jones, Litt.D., and H.A. Ormerod, M.A., in 4 Volumes. Cambridge, MA, Harvard University Press; London, William Heinemann Ltd. 1918. . Online version at the Perseus Digital Library
 Pausanias, Graeciae Descriptio. 3 vols. Leipzig, Teubner. 1903. Greek text available at the Perseus Digital Library.

Princes in Greek mythology
Mythological kings of Arcadia
Kings in Greek mythology
Arcadian mythology